Luís Eduardo Marques dos Santos (born 30 May 1997), commonly known as Dudu is a Brazilian professional footballer who plays as a right back for Atlético Goianiense.

Club career

Figueirense
Dudu was born in Gama, Federal District, joined the youth setup of Figueirense in 2013. Ahead of the 2016 season, he was promoted to the senior team and made his first team debut in a 1–0 victory over Fluminense.

At the end of 2017 Campeonato Catarinense, Dudu was awarded with the Best Newcomer of the Season award. He also came third in the award for the best right back of the tournament. He played regularly for the side in Série B and was included in Globo Esporte 's list of seven major revelations of the tournament.

Internacional
On 29 December 2017, Dudu signed for Internacional, newly promoted to Série A on a four-year deal. He made his debut for the club the following 27 January, starting in a 3–0 Campeonato Gaúcho home win over Avenida.

After featuring rarely during the 2018 season, Dudu suffered a serious ankle injury in November of that year, being sidelined for the most of the 2019 campaign, which he did not appear with the club.

Atlético Goianiense
On 29 December 2019, Dudu was loaned to Atlético Goianiense for the 2020 season, along with teammate Gustavo Ferrareis. He immediately became a starter at his new club, and signed a permanent two-year contract with Dragão on 8 March 2021.

Career statistics

Honours
Atlético Goianiense
Campeonato Goiano: 2020, 2022

References

External links
Dudu at Internacional's website

1997 births
Living people
Sportspeople from Federal District (Brazil)
Brazilian footballers
Association football fullbacks
Campeonato Brasileiro Série A players
Campeonato Brasileiro Série B players
Figueirense FC players
Sport Club Internacional players
Atlético Clube Goianiense players
Fortaleza Esporte Clube players